Großer Literaturpreis der Bayerischen Akademie der Schönen Künste (in English: Literature Award of the Bavarian Academy of the Fine Arts) was a Bavarian literary prize by the Bayerische Akademie der Schönen Künste. In 2010, it merged with the Thomas Mann Prize.

Winners 

1950 Friedrich Georg Jünger (Literaturpreis)
1951 Günter Eich
1953 Marieluise Fleißer 
1955 Gerd Gaiser und Martha Saalfeld
1957 Alfred Döblin 
1959 Agnes Miegel
1960 Otto Flake 
1961 Ilse Aichinger und Joachim Maass
1962 Martin Kessel
1963 Horst Lange
1964 Heimito von Doderer
1965 Wolfgang Koeppen
1966 Werner Kraft
1967 Franz Tumler
1968 Elisabeth Schnack
1969 Elias Canetti 
1970 Hans Paeschke and Rudolf Hartung
1971 Manès Sperber
1972 Jean Améry 
1973 Reiner Kunze
1974 Gershom Scholem
1975 Alfred Andersch 
1976 Hans Wollschläger
1977 Dolf Sternberger
1978 Günther Anders 
1980 Jürgen Becker 
1981 Botho Strauß 
1982 Wolfgang Hildesheimer
1983 Tankred Dorst
1984 Rose Ausländer
1985 Karl Krolow
1986 Hans Werner Richter (for the first time Großer Literaturpreis)
1987 Hans Magnus Enzensberger
1988 Hilde Spiel 
1989 Dieter Kühn
1990 Martin Walser
1991 Ilse Aichinger
1992 Christoph Ransmayr 
1993 Günter de Bruyn 
1994 Günter Grass 
1995 Walter Helmut Fritz
1996 Friederike Mayröcker 
1997 Paul Wühr
1998 Wilhelm Genazino
1999 Peter Kurzeck
2000 Anne Duden
2001 Uwe Timm 
2002 Urs Widmer
2003 Ror Wolf
2004 Michael Krüger
2005 Karl Heinz Bohrer
2006 Martin Mosebach
2007 Hans Joachim Schädlich
2008 Peter Handke (Award renamed to Thomas-Mann-Preis)

External links
 Bayerische Akademie der Schönen Künste 

Literary awards of Bavaria